Neil Teggart (born 16 September 1984 in Downpatrick) is a Northern Irish footballer. He was a Northern Ireland under-21 international, picking up two caps.

Career
He had been a very promising prospect, coming through the youth system at Sunderland, but after loan spells at Darlington and Scunthorpe United, he was released without breaking into the first team squad. After an unsuccessful spell at Perth Glory FC in Australia, he went to Scotland, where he played for Livingston and Hamilton Academical.

Teggart was to sign for Portadown in 2008, but after an administrative error cost them their Premiership status he opted to join Ballymena United, where he scored nine goals. He eventually signed a three-year deal with Portadown on 10 May 2009, following the club's promotion back to the Premiership.

On 11 July, Teggart scored his first goal for Portadown on his debut, in a friendly against Warrenpoint Town. He made his competitive league debut on 15 August, in the 2–1 home defeat against Glentoran.

Personal life

Teggart was arrested for assault in 2010.

References

External links
 Portadown F.C.official site
 

1984 births
Living people
Association footballers from Northern Ireland
Northern Ireland under-21 international footballers
Darlington F.C. players
Sunderland A.F.C. players
Scunthorpe United F.C. players
Perth Glory FC players
Livingston F.C. players
Hamilton Academical F.C. players
Ballymena United F.C. players
Portadown F.C. players
English Football League players
Scottish Football League players
NIFL Premiership players
Association football forwards